Greater Armenia is the name given to the Armenian state that emerged on the Armenian Highlands during the reign of King Artaxias I at the turn of the 2nd century BC. The term was used to refer principally to the fifteen provinces that made up Armenian kingdoms throughout the classical, late antique, and medieval periods by contemporary Armenian and non-Armenian authors alike.

Extent
Though its borders were never exactly defined, Greater Armenia usually referred to the stretch of land beginning from the Euphrates River to the west, the region of Artsakh and parts of what are now Azerbaijan and Iranian Azerbaijan to the east, parts of the modern state of Georgia to the north, with its southern boundary rounding the northern tip of Mesopotamia.

The Romans referred to it in Latin as Armenia Maior while the Greek-speaking peoples called it Armenia Megale, to differentiate it from Lesser Armenia (Pok'r Hayk′, in Latin Armenia Minor). It would later be used to distinguish it from the medieval kingdom that was established in Cilicia, which was sometimes referred to as Little Armenia (not to be confused with Lesser Armenia).

Maps

References

Further reading
Adontz, Nicholas. Armenia in the Period of Justinian: The Political Conditions Based on the Naxarar System, trans. Nina Garsoïan (Lisbon: Calouste Gulbenkian Foundation, 1970). 
Hewsen, Robert H. Armenia: A Historical Atlas (Chicago: Chicago University Press, 2001).

See also
Armenia (disambiguation)

States and territories established in the 2nd century BC
Kingdom of Armenia (antiquity)